Ota Sklenčka (19 December 1919 in Hradec Králové – 10 October 1993 in Prague) was a Czech actor. He starred in the film Poslední propadne peklu under director Ludvík Ráža in 1982.

Selected filmography
 Lovers in the Year One (1973)
 Poslední propadne peklu (1982)

References

1919 births
1993 deaths
Czech male film actors
Czech male stage actors
Actors from Hradec Králové
20th-century Czech male actors